Duke's Son is a 1920 British silent drama film directed by Franklin Dyall and starring Guy Newall, Ivy Duke and Hugh Buckler.

Cast
 Guy Newall as Lord Francis Delamere  
 Ivy Duke as Loan Lambourne  
 Hugh Buckler as Sir Robert Sheen  
 Lawford Davidson as Charles Denbeigh-Smith  
 Ruth Mackay as Mrs. Denbeigh-Smith  
 Edward O'Neill as Duke of Cheshire  
 Mary Merrall as Billy Honour  
 Philip Hewland as Lord Tarporley  
 Toni Edgar-Bruce as Mary Delamare  
 Douglas Munro as Burberry  
 Winifred Sadler as Mrs. Burberry

References

Bibliography
 Goble, Alan. The Complete Index to Literary Sources in Film. Walter de Gruyter, 1999.
 Low, Rachael. The History of the British Film 1918-1929. George Allen & Unwin, 1971.

External links
 

1920 films
1920 drama films
British drama films
British silent feature films
Films based on British novels
British black-and-white films
1920s English-language films
1920s British films
Silent drama films